Kolepi is a village in Estonia, in Võru Parish, which belongs to Võru County It has an estimated population of 105 residents. The village is situated north of Ala-Tilga and to the east of Mõksi.

References

Villages in Võru County
Võru Parish